In analysis, a branch of mathematics, Hilbert's inequality states that

 

for any sequence  of complex numbers.

Formulation

Let  be a sequence of complex numbers. If the sequence is infinite, assume that it is square-summable:

Hilbert's inequality (see ) asserts that

Extensions

In 1973, Montgomery & Vaughan reported several generalizations of Hilbert's inequality, considering the bilinear forms

 

and

 

Montgomery & Vaughan's generalizations of Hilbert's inequality are then given by

 

and

 

where

Moreover, if

then the following inequalities hold:

 

and

References

External links
 

Inequalities
Complex analysis
Number theory